The Diocese of Rožňava is a Roman Catholic diocese in southern Slovakia. It covers central and eastern parts of the Banská Bystrica Region and western parts of the Košice Region. Its seat is in Rožňava, covers an area of 7,000 km2 with 343,352 people of which 58% are of Catholic faith (2004).

Auxiliary Bishop Stanislav Stolárik, Titular Bishop of Barica, who until then had been serving as Auxiliary Bishop of the Roman Catholic Archdiocese of Košice, in Košice, Slovakia, was appointed Bishop of the Diocese of Rožňava on Saturday, 21 March 2015, by Pope Francis, succeeding Bishop Emeritus Vladimír Filo, who himself had succeeded Bishop Emeritus Eduard Kojnok in 2008.

History
The diocese was established by Maria Theresa on 13 March 1776 as a suffragan of the Archdiocese of Esztergom. It was then known by its German name diocese of Rosenau, or Hungarian name diocese of Rozsnyó. In 1776 János Galgóczy was appointed first Bishop of Rosenau, but died before taking charge. His successor, Count Antal Révay (1776–80), caused the church to be restored and the high altar to be renovated. Among his successors were: János Scitovszky (1827–38), later Bishop of Funfkirchen and Archbishop of Gran; Béla Bartakovics (1845–50), later archbishop of Eger.

On 30 December 1977, it was taken from the former metropolitan, and became part of the newly created Slovak ecclesiastical province together with the metropolitan  Diocese of Trnava.

The last change of metropolitan took place on 31 March 1995 when it was changed to the newly elevated Archdiocese of Košice.

List of bishops

Notes

External links
 Official website 
 Diocese of Rožňava at catholic-hierarchy.org
 Diocese of Rožňava at newadvent.org

Catholic Church in Slovakia
Roman Catholic dioceses in Slovakia